Aneil Rajah (born 30 July 1955) is a Trinidadian cricketer. He played in 56 first-class and 17 List A matches for Trinidad and Tobago from 1974 to 1988.

See also
 List of Trinidadian representative cricketers

References

External links
 

1955 births
Living people
Trinidad and Tobago cricketers